Taufiq Muqminin  is a Singaporean footballer currently playing as a defender for Home United.

He was nominated for the 2013 The New Paper Dollah Kassim Award and was followed by a call-up to train with the Young Lions the next year.

Career statistics 
As of 17 March 2019

References

External links

1996 births
Living people
Singaporean footballers
Association football midfielders
Singapore Premier League players
Young Lions FC players
Home United FC players